Papua Indonesia Air System was a cargo airline based in Biak, Papua, Indonesia. It was established in 2003 and started operations on 1 February 2003 and operated a cargo service between Jayapura and Wamena.

Future Destinations 
 Karawang - Karawang International Airport
 Tasikmalaya - Tasikmalaya Airport
 Yahukimo - Nop Goliat Dekai Airport

References 

Defunct airlines of Indonesia
Cargo airlines of Indonesia
Biak
Jayapura
Papua (province)
Airlines established in 2003
Airlines disestablished in 2011
Indonesian companies established in 2003